Pengiran Yura Indera Putera bin Pengiran Yunos (born 25 March 1996) is a Bruneian footballer who plays for DPMM FC and the Bruneian national team as a defender or midfielder.

Club career
Yura is a graduate of local grassroots football development scheme Projek Ikan Pusu (PIP) that has won many youth tournaments since its creation in 2001. He had a stint in the Bruneian leagues in 2012, lacing up for BIBD SRC in the Brunei National Football League, the precursor to the first season of the Brunei Super League.

Yura joined Majra FC for the 2014 season. His Majra career ended just 9 matches into the season after his club abruptly pulled out of the ongoing league.

Yura was selected to join Brunei's sole professional club DPMM FC at the start of 2015, alongside Khairul Anwar Abdul Rahim, Reduan Petara and Aminuddin Zakwan Tahir. He made 9 appearances for DPMM in the 2015 S.League, mostly as a substitute. From the beginning of the 2016 season, Yura was converted into a central defender by Steve Kean partly due to the departure of Boris Raspudić and also to give him more playing time.

Yura scored his first goal for DPMM on 5 August 2016 at home against Albirex Niigata (S), a last-minute winner against the expatriate Japanese side.

After three fruitful seasons under Kean, new Brazilian coach Renê Weber preferred to play a returning Abdul Aziz Tamit instead, restricting Yura to just eight appearances in the 2018 season. Nevertheless, under Adrian Pennock the following year, Yura managed to regain his starting place alongside Charlie Clough and Nur Ikhwan Othman in a back three formation. DPMM would then record the joint best defensive record of the league, emerging as champions by the time the league ended in September.

DPMM played domestically from 2020 to 2022 due to restrictions imposed by Brunei as a result of the COVID-19 pandemic. They competed in the 2022 Brunei FA Cup where Yura gained his first Brunei FA Cup winner's medal after winning the final 2–1 against Kasuka FC on 4 December.

DPMM returned to the Singapore Premier League starting from the 2023 season. In the match against Balestier Khalsa on 10 March, he was sent off for violent conduct in the 55th minute, making Balestier rally from two goals down to win 3–4.

International career

Youth international teams
Yura regularly appeared for Brunei at under-19, under-21 and under-23 levels even before his senior international debut in 2014. His first international tournament was the September 2013 AFF U-19 Youth Championship held in Indonesia where he started all of Brunei U19's five matches. Two months later, he joined the SEA Games contingent of Brunei for its 27th edition in Myanmar. He started the second and third games against Malaysia and Singapore respectively as Brunei U23 lost all their games in the football tournament.

Yura's next tournament was the 2014 AFC U-19 Championship qualification with the under-19s. Brunei placed bottom with three losses in their qualifying group that included North Korea, Thailand and Singapore. He was in the 2014 Hassanal Bolkiah Trophy squad for the defense of the Hassanal Bolkiah Trophy which Brunei U21 won in 2012 and played three games out of five.

Yura was back with the U23s in 2015 for the 2016 AFC U-23 Championship qualification held in March of that year and also the 28th SEA Games in Singapore. He played 6 games in total, losing in every game. 

Yura was called back to the under-21 side for the 2018 Hassanal Bolkiah Trophy held in April and May, as an overage player as he was a few months over the age limit. Playing in central defence for the tournament, he scored a last-minute winner against Thailand in the second match.

Full national team
Yura was selected for the Skuad Tabuan to compete in the 2014 AFF Suzuki Cup qualifying matches held in Laos in October 2014. With the team composed largely of Brunei DPMM FC players and led by its head coach Steve Kean, his future club coach started Yura for the crucial game against Myanmar in which they fell to a score of 1–3. Yura kept his place for the final game against Cambodia, losing 0–1.

Yura played for the national team at the 2016 AFF Suzuki Cup qualification matches held in Cambodia in October 2016, playing at centre-back to cover for Reduan Petara who was ruled out with injury. He was sent off in the 88th minute for a professional foul on Tith Dina in the second fixture, a 0–3 loss against hosts Cambodia.

Yura was one of 13 DPMM FC players to link up with the Brunei national team in early September 2018 for the AFF Suzuki Cup qualification matches of that year, against Timor-Leste. He was deployed by Kwon Oh-son in central midfield in the first leg which finished 3–1 to Timor-Leste. A reshuffling of tactics in the second leg saw Yura put on a commanding display at centre-back and resulted in a 1–0 shutout in favour of Brunei. Nevertheless, Brunei failed to advance to the Suzuki Cup group stage with a 2–3 aggregate loss.

Yura accepted a callup to the national team to face Mongolia home and away at the 2022 World Cup qualification held in June 2019. He was played in central midfield since several of his teammates pulled out of the Brunei selection. Brunei lost the first leg 2–0 away from Bandar Seri Begawan and managed to win 2–1 for the return leg, but nevertheless another repeat aggregate defeat sent the Wasps out of both the 2022 World Cup and the 2023 Asian Cup.

In September 2022, Yura returned to the national team and started both fixtures in a friendly tournament with the Maldives and Laos, recording one win and one loss for the Wasps. Later in December of that year, he was selected for the 2022 AFF Mitsubishi Electric Cup to be held in the participants' respective countries, although Brunei had to play their home games in Kuala Lumpur due to renovation works at the Hassanal Bolkiah National Stadium. In the first group game against Thailand, Yura scored an own goal in the 88th minute of normal time, which finished 0-5. He made three further appearances for the Wasps against the Philippines, Indonesia and Cambodia, all ending in heavy defeats.

Honours

DPMM FC
 S.League: 2015
 Singapore Premier League: 2019
 Brunei FA Cup: 2022

References

External links

1978 births
Living people
Association football midfielders
Bruneian Muslims
Bruneian footballers
Brunei international footballers
DPMM FC players
Competitors at the 2013 Southeast Asian Games
Competitors at the 2015 Southeast Asian Games
Competitors at the 2017 Southeast Asian Games
Southeast Asian Games competitors for Brunei